Frank Manuel López García (born 25 February 1995) is a Cuban professional footballer who currently plays for Rio Grande Valley FC in the USL Championship.

Club career
López played with the academy side of hometown team Cienfuegos, before moving to Florida and playing with the Miami Soccer Academy of the United Premier Soccer League. He had defected to the United States in October 2015 during the 2015 CONCACAF Men's Olympic Qualifying Championship, alongside teammates Emmanuel Labrada, Dairon Pérez and Yendry Torres.

On 15 March 2018, López signed with United Soccer League side LA Galaxy II.

On 15 July 2019, López joined USL side San Antonio FC on loan for the remainder of the season.

Following a loan spell from OKC Energy FC, López signed a permanent contract with Rio Grande Valley FC on February 8, 2022.

References

External links
 

1995 births
Living people
People from Cienfuegos
Soccer players from Miami
Defecting Cuban footballers
Association football forwards
Cuban footballers
Cuba youth international footballers
LA Galaxy II players
San Antonio FC players
OKC Energy FC players
Rio Grande Valley FC Toros players
Sacramento Republic FC players
USL Championship players
United Premier Soccer League players
Cuba under-20 international footballers